Qızılqazma or Kyzylkazma may refer to:
Qızılqazma, Davachi, Azerbaijan
Qızılqazma, Khizi, Azerbaijan